Publick Occurrences Both Forreign and Domestick was the first multi-page newspaper published in British colonial America. After its first issue, which carried an account that offended the colonial governor, the newspaper was promptly closed down by British colonial authorities, only days later. No other newspaper would appear in the colonies until fourteen years later.

History
Publick Occurrences Both Forreign and Domestick was the first multi-page newspaper published in the British colonies in America. Before then, single-page newspapers, called broadsides, were published in the English colonies and printed in Cambridge in 1689. The first edition of Publick Occurrences was published September 25, 1690, in Boston, then a city in the Dominion of New England, and was intended to be published monthly, "or, if any Glut of Occurrences happen, oftener." It was printed by American Richard Pierce of Boston, and it was edited by Benjamin Harris, who was a refugee from England who had unsuccessfully tried to establish a free press there. The newspaper consisted of four pages , with two columns, with the last page left blank, allowing one to conveniently write a letter about its news that could be sent to another family member or friend. Without Parliamentary support or any prospective advertising, Harris quickly published what would prove to be the first and last issue of his newspaper. The only known copy in existence is housed in the London Public Record office, where it was discovered in 1845 by the Reverend Joseph B. Felt.

The first and only issue, published Thursday September 25, 1690, had an account of a battle waged by General Fitz-John Winthrop during the French and Indian Wars covering the brutal treatment of French prisoners of war. No second edition was ever printed because the account angered the Colonial government, which ordered the immediate suspension of the paper, only four days later on September 29, 1690, and which referred to the paper as a "pamphlet" . All remaining issues of the newspaper were destroyed. The order stated:

The three-page newspaper did not contain any criticism on the new licensing law for printing newspapers, or make any issues about colonial government. Instead it appealed to and informed its readers about the various current issues, i.e. the smallpox outbreak, the successful harvest produced by the "Christianized" Indians, a murder, the execution of Native American prisoners of war. It also contained a story about the king of France, Louis XIV, who supposedly was sleeping with his son's wife. These issues were considered sensitive and questionable by colonial authorities, which led them to close down Harris' newspaper.

After the prompt suppression of Publick Occurrences and the subsequent passage of the newspaper and printing licensing law, future prospective publishers were discouraged from establishing new newspapers until 1704, when John Campbell established The Boston News-Letter. Campbell diligently made efforts to begin publication of his newspaper under authority, and with the proper license. Remembering the fate of the first newsletter, Campbell was careful not to print anything that could be construed as libelous or that otherwise would offend the Governor and the council; he generally limited himself to the reprinting of material taken from the London Flying Post and The London Gazette.

See also
 Early American publishers and printers
 List of early American publishers and printers
 History of American newspapers
 History of newspaper publishing

References

Bibliography

 
 
 
 
 
 
 

1690 establishments in Massachusetts
Defunct newspapers published in Massachusetts
Publications established in 1690
1690 disestablishments in Massachusetts
17th century in Boston